Voyage in the Night (Swedish: Resa i natten) is a 1955 Swedish drama film directed by Hampe Faustman and starring George Fant, Eva Dahlbeck and Ulla Sallert. It was shot at the Centrumateljéerna Studios in Stockholm. The film's sets were designed by the art director Nils Nilsson.

Cast
 George Fant as Gösta Lundberg
 Eva Dahlbeck as 	Birgitta Lundberg
 Ulla Sallert as 	Irene Haller Alias Anna-Lisa Karlsson
 Sven-Eric Gamble as 	Åke Eriksson
 Arne Källerud as 	Jompa
 Amy Jelf as 	Britt-Marie - Åke's Fiancée
 Gunnar Olsson as 	Johan - Britt-Marie's Father
 Catrin Westerlund as Kerstin
 Peter Lindgren as 	Berra
 Georg Skarstedt as Johansson
 Ivar Wahlgren as Cattle Controller
 Elisabeth Liljenroth as 	The Girl in Johansson's Truck
 Curt 'Minimal' Åström as 	Svensson
 Gösta Holmström as Police
 Barbro Hörberg as 	Bettan - Irene's Friend
 Ragnar Arvedson as 	Danish Theatre Manager 
 Björn Berglund as 	Doctor 
 Sven-Axel Carlsson as 	Steinar - Truck Driver 
 David Erikson as 	Café Supervisor 
John Harryson as 	Car Driver 
 Sven Holmberg as 	Clerk 
 Arthur Hultling as 	Truck Driver 
 Stig Johanson as 	Truck Driver 
 Birger Lensander as 	Lasse 
 Karin Miller as 	Waitress 
 Marianne Nielsen as 	Gossip 
 Hanny Schedin as 	Car Driver 
 Sture Ström as 	Major 
 Bengt Sundmark as 	Mankan
 Ilse-Nore Tromm as 	Britt-Marie's Mother 
 Gunnel Wadner as Telegraph Clerk

References

Bibliography 
 Qvist, Per Olov & von Bagh, Peter. Guide to the Cinema of Sweden and Finland. Greenwood Publishing Group, 2000.

External links 
 

1955 films
Swedish drama films
1955 drama films
1950s Swedish-language films
Films directed by Hampe Faustman
Swedish black-and-white films
1950s Swedish films